William Vernon (January 17, 1719 – December 22, 1806), of Newport, Rhode Island, was a merchant in the Atlantic slave trade who played a leading role in the Continental Congress' maritime activities during the American Revolution. In 1774, Vernon was member of the committee of correspondence between Newport and Boston. As president of the Eastern Navy Board during the Revolution, he was responsible for building and outfitting the ships of the Continental Navy. William Vernon was one of the charter members of the Artillery Company of Newport, and is the namesake of the Vernon House.

Family 
William Vernon was born in Newport, Rhode Island in 1719 to a local silversmith, Samuel Vernon (December 6, 1683 - December 5, 1737) and his wife Elizabeth Fleet. Vernon's family was directly descended from one of Rhode Island's first pioneers, Anne Hutchinson. William's older brother Thomas became royal postmaster in Newport, a position he held for thirty years. He was also senior warden of Trinity Church, and Secretary of the Redwood Library.  A Loyalist, Thomas fled Newport in 1776. Unlike their loyalist brother, who was an Anglican, William and his older brother Samuel (September 6, 1711 - 1792) were both members of Newport's Second Congregational Church, which was pastored by Ezra Stiles. William Vernon married Judith Harwood, who was a direct descendant of Jeremy Clarke and John Cranston. William and Judith had two sons, Samuel and William.

Smuggler and slave trader 
William and his brother Samuel entered into business together, eventually establishing themselves as prominent merchants. Thomas did not enter into trade with his other siblings. William and Samuel, made a name for themselves successfully by first utilizing the bilateral trade between New England and the West Indies. The Vernons traded regularly between Halifax, Boston, Philadelphia and Georgia, supplying rum, molasses, flour and leather.

In 1737, the Vernons expanded to the triangle trade, otherwise known as the Atlantic slave trade, eventually becoming the most prolific slave traders of Newport. In that year they financed their first ship, the Olive Branch, captained by John Godfrey. Incredible profits were made by purchasing slaves in Africa with rum from the colonies, selling those slaves in the West Indies, and in North America, including Rhode Island. The Vernons then used those profits to purchase molasses from those ports before buying more rum in the colonies, continuing the triangular cycle of trade.

Over the course of sixty years, the Vernons financed well over forty slave voyages to the coasts of West Africa. Beginning in the 1750s, the Vernons became one of the first Newport merchants to sell African slaves directly to the southern colonies, instead of exclusively in the West Indies. Their ships returning from the West Indies offloaded slaves in South Carolina in exchange for barrels of rice destined for markets in New England. However, the Vernons also sold enslaved people to Rhode Island directly from West Africa. Their first sale to the southern colonies was made in Charleston in 1755. The Vernons serve as a perfect example of the pivotal role Rhode Island played in the American slave trade—they had at one time as many as eight vessels engaged in the trade.

Royal Charlotte 
One of the more famous vessels of the Vernons was the brig Royal Charlotte. The Royal Charlotte was used in at least two slave voyages to West Africa. Once in 1762, and again in 1767. A report from the Newport Mercury on June 6, 1763, reveals an uprising of enslaved people that happened aboard the 1762 voyage. Following this uprising, Captain Taylor brought the remaining enslaved African peoples to Rhode Island for sale. An advertisement for the cargo describes them as a "Parcel of extreme fine, healthy and well limbed Gold Coast Slaves; Men, Women, Boys and Girls." Clients were encourage to view the cargo on the Royal Charlotte, docked at Taylor's Wharf.

In 1776, the Royal Charlotte was seized by the British in Newport harbor, taken to Boston, and confiscated with along with its cargo.

Slave voyages of the Vernon family

Contributions to the American Revolution 
William's success in Newport meant he was well known to the British.  Samuel and William were both early supporters of the revolution; Samuel was even one of the ringleaders responsible for the Stamp Act Riots of 1765.  Their other sibling, Thomas was a Loyalist or Tory sent into a brief exile in Glocester, Rhode Island, but Thomas remained friendly with the brothers throughout the war.  As a result of his well-known political beliefs, William was forced to flee Newport prior to the British occupation of Newport in 1776. Vernon fled to Rehoboth, Massachusetts, hoping to protect his family. His nephew remained at the Vernon House to protect it during this time. The Vernon House, located on Clarke Street in Newport, was the headquarters of the Comte de Rochambeau during the revolution, General George Washington and the Marquis de Lafayette both were guests at the Vernon House.

After moving closer to the heart of revolutionary activity, Vernon was appointed by the Continental Congress as the president of the Continental Naval Board on May 6, 1777.  This position was effectively the precursor to the Department of the Navy (effectively making Vernon the first Secretary of the Navy, before the position was officially established in the 1790s). In this position, Vernon was responsible for building and outfitting the ships of the Continental Navy for the duration of the American Revolution.

Vernon was extremely dedicated to his duties; on several occasions, he actually contributed some of his own personal wealth to the cause with little chance of collecting interest or even repayment. After the Revolution, Vernon became involved in the Board of the Admiralty before returning to Newport.

Cato Vernon 
On March 17, 1778, one of the African men William Vernon had enslaved, known as Cato Vernon, enlisted in the Rhode Island First Regiment.

Post-Revolution 
Following the Revolution, William Vernon continued to expand his activities and influence within the Newport community.  He was a president of the Redwood Library, founding member of the Newport Artillery Company in 1741 and a key figure in establishing the Newport Bank in 1803. In 1990, the remaining assets of this bank were purchased by Citizens Bank. William Vernon was an early benefactor of the College of New Jersey (now known as Princeton University). William Vernon and his family continued his Atlantic slave trade activities after the revolution and following his brother Samuel's death in 1792, until at least 1799.

Death 
William Vernon is buried in the Vernon Cemetery on Warner Street in Newport, Rhode Island.  His house, Vernon House, is a National Historic Landmark.

Children 
Samuel Vernon Jr. (May 29, 1757 – 1834) 
Husband of Elizabeth Ellery, a daughter of Christopher Ellery. An eminent Newport merchant, and one time its wealthiest citizen. The first president of the Newport Bank, and the president of the Rhode Island Insurance Company. Fought as a volunteer under General John Sullivan at the Battle of Rhode Island in 1778.
William H. Vernon Jr. (March 6, 1759 – 1833) 
Graduated from Princeton in 1776. Was for many years the Secretary of the Redwood Library. A Francophile, Vernon frequented the court of Louis XVI in Paris (where he was an aide to Benjamin Franklin) and on the death of his father spent his entire eighty-thousand-dollar inheritance on a collection of fifty-two Old Master paintings, thereby forming one of the first important collections of such works in this country. They hung for many years at Vernon House (which still stands on the corner of Clarke and Mary Streets) and undoubtedly enticed other Newport residents to collect within the same parameters.
At one time during the French Revolution, Vernon was recognized as a courtier by the mob, dragged to a lamp-post, and was only rescued from being hanged by a Frenchman who knew him and assured the mob that he was an American citizen.

See also 

 Vernon House
 Abraham Redwood
 Aaron Lopez

References 

Thomas Vernon's 1776 Diary on Google Book Search

1719 births
1806 deaths
Businesspeople from Newport, Rhode Island
People of Rhode Island in the American Revolution
American slave traders
Patriots in the American Revolution
Princeton University people
People of colonial Rhode Island
Burials at Common Burying Ground and Island Cemetery